The Atjinuri  were an indigenous Australian people of the Cape York Peninsula of Queensland.

Country
The Atjinuri's land covered roughly  running south along the upper Ducie River to the upper Wenlock River.

Alternative names
 Adjinadi.
 Itinadjana, Itinadyana, Itinadyand.
 Nedgulada.
 Imatjana.
 ?Ulwauwudjana.
 Ulwadjana.

Notes

Citations

u

Sources

Aboriginal peoples of Queensland